Dame Cleo Laine, Lady Dankworth  (born Clementine Dinah Campbell; 28 October 1927) is an English jazz and pop singer and an actress, known for her scat singing and for her vocal range. Though her natural range is that of a contralto, she is able to produce a G above high C, giving her an overall compass of well over three octaves. Laine is the only female performer to have received Grammy nominations in the jazz, popular and classical music categories. She is the widow of jazz composer and musician Sir John Dankworth.

Early life
Laine was born Clementine Dinah Campbell in Southall, Middlesex (now London) to Alexander Sylvan Campbell, a black Jamaican who worked as a building labourer and regularly busked, and Minnie Bullock, a white English farmer's daughter from Swindon, Wiltshire, whose maiden name was reportedly Hitching. 

The family moved constantly, but most of Laine's childhood was spent in Southall. She attended the Board School there on Featherstone Road (later known as Featherstone Primary School) and was sent by her mother for singing and dancing lessons at an early age. She went on to attend Mellow Lane Senior School in Hayes before going to work as an apprentice hairdresser, a hat-trimmer, a librarian, and in a pawnbroker's shop.

In 1946, Laine married George Langridge, a roof tiler, with whom she had a son, Stuart. The couple divorced in 1957. It was not until 1953, when she was 26 and applying for a passport for a forthcoming tour of Germany, that Laine found out her real birth name, owing to her parents not being married at the time and her mother registering her under her own name (Hitching).

Career

Laine auditioned successfully, at the age of 24, for John Dankworth's small group, the Dankworth Seven, and later his orchestra, with which she performed until 1958. Dankworth and Laine married that year. She played the lead in a new play at London's Royal Court Theatre, home of the new wave of playwrights of the 1950s such as John Osborne and Harold Pinter. This led to other stage performances, such as the musical Valmouth in 1959, the play A Time to Laugh (with Robert Morley and Ruth Gordon) in 1962, Boots With Strawberry Jam (with John Neville) in 1968, and eventually to her role as Julie in Wendy Toye's production of Show Boat at the Adelphi Theatre in London in 1971. Show Boat had its longest run to date in that London season with 910 performances staged.

During this period, she had two major recording successes. "You'll Answer to Me" reached the British Top 10 while Laine was "prima donna" in the 1961 Edinburgh Festival production of Kurt Weill's opera/ballet The Seven Deadly Sins, directed and choreographed by Kenneth MacMillan. In 1964, her Shakespeare and All that Jazz album with Dankworth was well received. Dankworth and Laine founded the Stables theatre in 1970, in what was the old stables block in the grounds of their home. It eventually hosted over 350 concerts per year.

Laine's international activities began in 1972, with a successful first tour of Australia, where she released six top-100 albums throughout the 1970s. Shortly afterwards, her career in the United States was launched with a concert at New York's Lincoln Center, followed in 1973 by the first of many Carnegie Hall appearances. Coast-to-coast tours of the US and Canada soon followed, and with them a succession of record albums and television appearances, including The Muppet Show in 1977. This led, after several nominations, to her first Grammy award, in recognition of the live recording of her 1983 Carnegie concert. She has continued to tour periodically, including in Australia in 2005.

She has collaborated with James Galway, Nigel Kennedy, Julian Lloyd Webber and John Williams. Other important recordings during that time were duet albums with Ray Charles (Porgy and Bess) as well as Arnold Schoenberg's Pierrot Lunaire, for which she received a Grammy Award nomination.

Laine's relationship with the musical theatre started in Britain and continued in the United States with starring performances in Sondheim's A Little Night Music and Franz Lehár's The Merry Widow (Michigan Opera). In 1980 she starred in Colette, a musical by Dankworth. The show began at the Stables theatre, Wavendon, in 1979 and transferred to the Comedy Theatre, London, in September 1980. In 1985 she originated the role of Princess Puffer in the Broadway musical The Mystery of Edwin Drood, for which she received a Tony nomination. In 1989, she received the Los Angeles critics' acclaim for her portrayal of the Witch in Sondheim's Into the Woods. In May 1992, Laine appeared with Frank Sinatra for a week of concerts at the Royal Albert Hall in London.

Laine is famed for not only her interpretative style, but also her almost-four-octave range and vocal adaptability. As well as hitting deep soulful notes, Laine's scatting and top notes have become her signature. Though her natural range is that of a contralto, she is able to produce a G above high C. Derek Jewel of the Sunday Times dubbed her "quite simply the best singer in the world."

Awards and honours
 Officer of the Order of the British Empire, 1979
 Grammy Award nomination, Best Female Jazz Vocalist, Smilin' Through with Dudley Moore, 1983
 Grammy Award for Best Jazz Vocal Performance, Female, 1986
 Lifetime Achievement Award, U.S. recording industry, 1991
 Dame Commander of the Order of the British Empire, 1997
 Lifetime Achievement Award, Worshipful Company of Musicians, 2002
 Gold Award, BBC Jazz Awards, 2008
 BASCA Gold Badge Award, 2016
 Honorary Fellow, Hughes Hall, University of Cambridge
 A street in Adelaide, South Australia, was named after her.
 Honorary doctorates: Berklee College of Music, University of Cambridge, University of York, Open University, University of Luton

Discography

 She's the Tops! (MGM, 1957)
 In retrospect (MGM), 1957
 Jazz Date with Tubby Hayes (Wing, 1961)
 All About Me (Fontana, 1962)
 Shakespeare and All That Jazz (Fontana, 1964)
 Woman to Woman (Fontana, 1966)
 Sir William Walton's Facade with Annie Ross (Fontana, 1967)
 If We Lived on the Top of a Mountain (Fontana, 1968)
 The Unbelievable (Fontana, 1968)
 Soliloquy (Fontana, 1968)
 Portrait (Philips, 1971)
 Feel the Warm (Columbia, 1972)
 An Evening with Cleo Laine & the John Dankworth Quartet (Philips, 1972)
 I Am a Song (RCA Victor, 1973)
 Day by Day (Stanyan, 1973)
 Cleo Laine Live!!! at Carnegie Hall (RCA Victor, 1974)
 A Beautiful Thing (RCA Victor, 1974)
 Sings Pierrot Lunaire (RCA Red Seal, 1974)
 Cleo Close Up (RCA Victor, 1974)
 Spotlight On Cleo Laine (Philips, 1974)
 Easy Livin (Stanyan, 1975)
 Cleo Laine (MGM, 1975)
 Best Friends with John Williams (RCA Victor, 1976)
 Born on a Friday (RCA Victor, 1976)
 Porgy & Bess with Ray Charles (RCA Victor, 1976)
 At the Wavendon Festival (Black Lion, 1976)
 A Lover and His Lass with Johnny Dankworth (Esquire, 1976)
 Return to Carnegie (RCA Victor, 1977)
 Cleo's Greatest Show Hits (RCA Victor, 1978)
 Gonna Get Through (RCA Victor, 1978)
 Cleo Laine Sings Word Songs (RCA Victor, 1978)
 Cleo Laine in Australia with Johnny Dankworth (World Record Club, 1978)
 Cleo's Choice (Marble Arch, 1974)
 Sometimes When We Touch with James Galway (RCA Red Seal, 1980)
 Cleo Laine in Concert (RCA Victor, 1980)
 One More Day (Sepia, 1981)
 Smilin' Through with Dudley Moore (CBS, 1982)
 Let the Music Take You with John Williams (CBS, 1983)
 That Old Feeling (K West, 1984)
 Cleo at Carnegie: The 10th Anniversary Concert (RCA Victor, 1984)
 At the Carnegie: Cleo Laine in Concert (Sierra, 1986)
 The Unforgettable Cleo Laine (PRT, 1987)
 Cleo Sings Sondheim with Jonathan Tunick (RCA Victor, 1988)
 Woman to Woman (RCA Victor, 1989)
 Jazz (RCA Victor, 1991)
 Nothing without You with Mel Torme (Concord Jazz, 1992)
 On the Town with Michael Tilson Thomas (Deutsche Grammophon, 1993)
 Blue and Sentimental (RCA Victor, 1994)
 Solitude with the Duke Ellington Orchestra (RCA Victor, 1995)
 Quality Time (Sepia, 2002)
 Loesser Genius with Laurie Holloway (Qnote, 2003)

References

External links
 Official website
 
 
 
 
 Radio interview with Nathan Morley from April 2010. Cyprus Broadcasting Corporation.
 Daily Telegraph profile, 2 August 2007.
 John Fordham, Beethoven with a Bass Guitar? Fine! (interview with Cleo Laine and Johnny Dankworth), The Guardian, 15 November 2007.

1927 births
Living people
20th-century Black British women singers
21st-century Black British women singers
Berklee College of Music alumni
Black Lion Records artists
British women jazz singers
Dames Commander of the Order of the British Empire
English jazz singers
English people of Jamaican descent
English stage actresses
Fellows of Hughes Hall, Cambridge
Grammy Award winners
People from Southall
Scat singers
Singers awarded knighthoods
Singers from London
Traditional pop music singers
Wives of knights